César de Oliveira (born 17 May 1977 in Porto) is a  Portuguese composer.

External links
 Living Composers Project biographical page, accessed 10 February 2010
 Classical Composers website profile

1977 births
Living people
Portuguese composers
Portuguese male composers
Musicians from Porto
21st-century classical composers
21st-century Portuguese male musicians